The National Association for Bikers with a Disability or NABD is a Registered Charity (No. 1040907) in the United Kingdom and (No. SC039897) in Scotland. The NABD gives technical advice and financial grants to help to adapt motorcycles, sidecars and trikes for use by disabled riders. It also gives advice on training and rider assessments. It owns a fleet of learner-legal motorcycles adapted for various disabilities, which it loans free of charge for training and tests.

The NABD is routinely consulted on issues relating to disabled motorcycling by the DVLA, DfT, VOSA, DSA, and MAVIS (the Mobility Advice and Vehicle Information Service).

History

The NABD was set up in April 1991 by six motorcyclists in Stockport and Manchester who would not accept the idea that disabled people could not ride motorcycles, scooters, or trikes.

The initial project was to find a way to adapt a motorcycle for a rider who had suffered the amputation of his lower left leg in an accident. A fund raising party was organised and publicised locally and this prompted several other disabled people to contact the group asking whether it was possible for them also to ride motorcycles. Within 12 months the NABD had just over 100 members and had helped three disabled people to adapt motorcycles and ride independently. Each adaption had to be designed from scratch, the money raised and the engineering problems solved, but from this small beginning the NABD was later to become the World leader in motorcycling for disabled people.

The membership of the NABD has now grown to more than 8,000 individual members and has more than 130 affiliated clubs and businesses. Since its foundation the NABD has directly helped over ten thousand disabled people to enjoy the freedom and independence of motorcycling.

The NABD has been instrumental in the founding of similar groups in Norway, Sweden, France, the US, South Africa and Japan.

Throughout its history the NABD has been organised and managed by motorcyclists who work on a voluntary unpaid basis.

The NABD have two paid employees, these are in the administrative rolls of Office Manager and Administrative Assistant.  Neither of these employees takes a direct part in decisions the relating to the governance of the NABD.

Personal membership is open to everyone (regardless of whether they have a disability or not) and members receive various benefits including a copy of the NABD's quarterly magazine Open House

Clubs can also affiliate to the NABD, any club is able to affiliate whether they are motorcycle related or not. There are two tiers for club affiliation, Standard and Premium  and there are various benefits depending on which affiliation is chosen.

Business affiliation is also available for any business. There are four different business affiliation choices, each with their own series of benefits.

All of these membership and affiliation schemes go towards the running and support of the charity.

The NABD also have a quarterly magazine called Open House which is sent out to all members and affiliates. It includes details about the charity, event reviews, adaptations and grants as well as other news about the motorcycling scene.

Expenses

The NABD ensures that 100% of all financial donations from individuals, clubs or companies are used 100% for the benefit of, and services for, disabled riders.

The administration costs of the association are met from membership contributions and direct fundraising events such as the annual You've Been Nabbed rally which attracts more than 3,000 motorcyclists from throughout the British Isles and Northern Europe. The NABD does not spend donated money on wages and office accommodation. The NABD has two full-time office administrators. The first post was initially financed by a grant from the National Lottery Community Fund, and both posts are now wholly financed by the proceeds of the NABD's You've Been Nabbed rally. Everyone else who works for the NABD is an unpaid volunteer.

Fundraising

The NABD holds a rally at The Cheshire Showground, Tabley, Knutsford, Cheshire. one weekend in May each year. This is both a social and a fundraising event that raises thousands of pounds for the charity. The NABD holds a number of smaller rallies in different parts of Britain during the course of each year for the same purpose. A number of motorcycle clubs also donate profits from their rallies, custom motorcycle shows and other events to the NABD.

Patrons
The NABD currently has nine patrons:

Billy Connolly, CBE, comedian and actor
Gary Havelock, motorcycle speedway rider
Neil Hodgson, 2003 Superbike World Champion
David Holding, OBE, Paralympics gold medallist
Sammy Miller, OBE, former international motorcycle trials champion and grass track rider
Mark O'Shea, herpetologist and television presenter
Suzi Perry, sports television presenter
Lord Rotherwick, member of the House of Lords
Mik Scarlet, TV presenter and disc jockey
Stevie Simpson, Singer/Songwriter

References

External links
 
 
 

Motorcyclists organizations
Charities for disabled people based in the United Kingdom
Transport charities based in the United Kingdom
1991 establishments in the United Kingdom
Organizations established in 1991
Motorcycling in the United Kingdom